Nocardioides caricicola is a gram-positive and coccoid to rod-shaped bacterium from the genus Nocardioides that has been isolated from a root of the plant Carex scabrifolia on Namhae Island, South Korea.

References

External links
Type strain of Nocardioides caricicola at BacDive -  the Bacterial Diversity Metadatabase	

caricicola
Bacteria described in 2011